John Harry Patrick Hooper (born 14 January 1986) is an English former first-class cricketer.

The son of the cricketer Mike Hooper, he was born at Tooting Bec and was educated at Charterhouse, before going up to Oxford Brookes University. While studying at Oxford Brookes, he played first-class cricket for Oxford MCCU from 2006–08, making seven appearances. He scored 265 runs in his seven matches at an average of 29.44 and a high score of 79, one of two half centuries that he made.

Notes and references

External links

1986 births
Living people
People from Tooting
People educated at Charterhouse School
Alumni of Oxford Brookes University
English cricketers
Oxford MCCU cricketers